is a Kōya-san Shingon temple in Itano, Tokushima Prefecture, Japan. Temple 3 on the Shikoku 88 temple pilgrimage, the main image is of Shaka Nyorai. Said to have been founded by Gyōki, it was rebuilt in the Edo period after being burned by the Chōsokabe.

See also

 Shikoku 88 temple pilgrimage

References

Buddhist pilgrimage sites in Japan
Buddhist temples in Tokushima Prefecture
Kōyasan Shingon temples